An  is a Japanese portrait print or painting in the ukiyo-e genre showing only the head or the head and upper torso. Katsukawa Shunkō I (1743–1812) is generally credited with producing the first ōkubi-e. He, along with Katsukawa Shunshō, designed ōkubi-e of male kabuki actors. In the early-1790s, Utamaro designed the first ōkubi-e of beautiful women (bijin-ga ōkubi-e). The shogunate authorities banned ōkubi-e in 1800, but the ban was lifted after eight years.

Gallery

References

Further reading
 Newland, Amy Reigle. (2005). Hotei Encyclopedia of Japanese Woodblock Prints. Amsterdam: Hotei. ;  OCLC 61666175
 Roberts, Laurance P. (1976). A Dictionary of Japanese Artists. New York: Weatherhill. ;  OCLC 2005932 

Ukiyo-e genres